Symbiosis in lichens is the mutually helpful symbiotic relationship of green algae and/or blue-green algae (cyanobacteria) living among filaments of a fungus, forming lichen.

Living as a symbiont in a lichen appears to be a successful way for a fungus to derive essential nutrients, as about 20% of all fungal species have acquired this mode of life. The autotrophic symbionts occurring in lichens are a wide variety of simple, photosynthetic organisms commonly and traditionally known as “algae”. These symbionts include both prokaryotic and eukaryotic organisms.

Overview of lichens

"Lichens are fungi that have discovered agriculture" — Trevor Goward

A  lichen is a combination of fungus and/or algae and/or cyanobacteria that has a very different form (morphology), physiology, and biochemistry than any of the constituent species growing separately. The algae or cyanobacteria benefit their fungal partner by producing organic carbon compounds through photosynthesis. In return, the fungal partner benefits the algae or cyanobacteria by protecting them from the environment by its filaments, which also gather moisture and nutrients from the environment, and (usually) provide an anchor to it.

The majority of the lichens contain eukaryotic autotrophs belonging to the Chlorophyta (green algae) or to the Xanthophyta (yellow-green algae). About 90% of all known lichens have a green alga as a symbiont. Among these, Trebouxia is the most common genus, occurring in about 20% of all lichens. The second most commonly represented green alga genus is Trentepohlia. Overall, about 100 species are known to occur as autotrophs in lichens. All the algae and cyanobacteria are believed to be able to survive separately, as well as within the lichen; that is, at present no algae or cyanobacteria are known which can only survive naturally as part of a lichen. Common algal partners are Trebouxia, Pseudotrebouxia, or Myrmecia.

The prokaryotes belong to the Cyanobacteria, which are often called by their old name “bluegreen algae”. Bluegreen algae occur as symbionts only in about 8% of known lichens. The most commonly occurring genera of symbiotic cyanobacteria are Nostoc and Scytonema.

Nomenclature
Both the lichen and the fungus partner bear the same scientific name, and the lichens are being integrated into the classification schemes for fungi. Depending on context, the taxonomic name can be meant to refer to the entire lichen, or just the fungus that is part of the lichen.

The alga or cyanobacterim bears its own scientific name, which bears no relationship to either the name of the lichen or the fungus.

Fungus component
About 20% of all fungal species are able to form lichens. The fungal partner may be an Ascomycete or Basidiomycete. Overall, about 98% of lichens have an ascomycetous mycobiont. Next to the Ascomycota, the largest number of lichenized fungi occur in the unassigned fungi imperfecti. Comparatively few basidiomycetes are lichenized, but these include agarics, such as species of Lichenomphalia, clavarioid fungi, such as species of Multiclavula, and corticioid fungi, such as species of Dictyonema.

The largest number of lichenized fungi occur in the Ascomycota, with about 40% of species forming such an association. Some of these lichenized fungi occur in orders with nonlichenized fungi that live as saprotrophs or plant parasites (for example, the Leotiales, Dothideales, and Pezizales).

Other lichen fungi occur in only five orders in which all members are engaged in this habit (Orders Graphidales, Gyalectales, Peltigerales, Pertusariales, and Teloschistales). Lichenized and nonlichenized fungi can even be found in the same genus or species.

Photosynthetic component
The photosynthetic component of a lichen is called the photobiont or phycobiont.  The layer of tissue containing the cells of the photobiont is called the “photobiontic layer”.

Approximately 100 species of photosynthetic partners from 40 genera and 5 distinct classes (prokaryotic: Cyanophyceae; eukaryotic: Trebouxiophyceae, Phaeophyceae, Chlorophyceae) have been found to associate with the lichen-forming fungi.

A particular fungus species and algal species are not necessarily always associated together in a lichen. One fungus, for example, can form lichens with a variety of different algae. The thalli produced by a given fungal symbiont with its differing partners will be similar, and the secondary metabolites identical, indicating that the fungus has the dominant role in determining the morphology of the lichen. Further, the same algal species can occur in association with different fungal partners. Lichens are known in which there is one fungus associated with two or even three algal species. Rarely, the reverse can occur, and two or more fungal species can interact to form the same lichen.

Green algae
About 90% of all known lichens have a green alga as a symbiont. “Clorococcoid” means a green alga (Chlorophyta) that has single cells that are globose, which is common in lichens. This was once classified in the order Chlorococcales, which one may find stated in older literature, but new DNA data shows many independent lines of evolution exist among this formerly large taxonomic group. Chlorococcales is now a relatively small order and may no longer include any lichen photobionts.

The term “Trebouxioid” refers to members of the Trebouxia algae or other algae that resemble them: a clorococcoid green algae photobiont in the genus Trebouxia. Algae that resemble members of the Trebouxia are presumed to be in the class Trebouxiophyceae and go by the same descriptive name (Trebouxioid). Trebouxia was once included here, but is now considered to be in a separate class Trebouxiophyceae.

Cyanolichens
Although the photobionts are almost always green algae (chlorophyta), sometimes the lichen contains a blue-green alga instead (cyanobacteria, not an alga taxonomically), and sometimes both types of photobionts are found in the same lichen.

A cyanolichen is a lichen with a cyanobacterium as its main photosynthetic component (photobiont).
Many cyanolichens are small and black, and have limestone as the substrate.

Another cyanolichen group, the jelly lichens ( e.g., from the genera Collema or Leptogium) are large and foliose (e.g., species of Peltigera, Lobaria, and Degelia. These lichen species are grey-blue, especially when dampened or wet. Many of these characterize the Lobarion communities of higher rainfall areas in western Britain, e.g., in the Celtic Rainforest.

Parasitic fungi
Some fungi can only be found living on lichens as obligate parasites; They are not considered part of the lichen. These are referred to as “lichenolous fungi”.

References

Lichenology